Gibeauxia is a genus of moths of the family Crambidae. It contains only one species, Gibeauxia gibeauxi, which is found in French Guiana.

References

Scopariinae
Crambidae genera
Monotypic moth genera